Andy Warhol directed or produced nearly 150 films. Fifty of the films have been preserved by the Museum of Modern Art. In August 2014, the Museum of Modern Art began a project to digitise films previously unseen and to show them to the public.

See also
 You Are the One

References

External links
 

Warhol, Andy